Wingate is an unincorporated community in Boggs Township, Centre County, Pennsylvania, United States. It is at the junction of PA 144 and PA 504. 

Bald Eagle Area Middle and High School and Wingate Elementary School are in Wingate.

References

Unincorporated communities in Centre County, Pennsylvania
Unincorporated communities in Pennsylvania